Percnarcha lilloi is a moth in the family Gelechiidae. It was described by Paul Köhler in 1941. It is found in Tucumán Province, Argentina.

References

Gelechiinae
Moths described in 1941